Courier is a monospaced slab serif typeface. The typeface was designed by Howard "Bud" Kettler (1919–1999). Initially created for IBM's typewriters, it has been adapted for use as a computer font, and versions of it are installed on most desktop computers.

History
IBM did not trademark the name Courier, so the typeface design concept and its name are now public domain. According to some sources, a later version for IBM's Selectric typewriters was developed with input from Adrian Frutiger, although Paul Shaw writes that this is a confusion with Frutiger's adaptation of his Univers typeface for the Selectric system. Sources differ on whether the design was published in 1955 or 1956.

As a monospaced font, in the 1990s Courier found renewed use in the electronic world in situations where columns of characters must be consistently aligned, for instance, in coding. It has also become an industry standard for all screenplays to be written in 12-point Courier or a close variant. Twelve-point Courier New was also the U.S. State Department's standard typeface until January 2004, when it was replaced with 14-point Times New Roman. Reasons for the change included the desire for a more "modern" and "legible" font.

Kettler was once quoted about how the name was chosen. The font was nearly released with the name "Messenger". After giving it some thought, Kettler said, "A letter can be just an ordinary messenger, or it can be the courier, which radiates dignity, prestige, and stability."

Variants

Code variants 
With the rise of digital computing, variants of the Courier typeface were developed with features helpful in coding: larger punctuation marks, stronger distinctions between similar characters (such as the numeral 0 vs. the upper-case O and the numeral 1 vs. the lower-case L), sans-serif variants, and other features to provide increased legibility when viewed on screens. Today, many Courier typefaces include a code version within the type family. Courier New Baltic, Courier New CE, Courier New Cyr, Courier New Greek, Courier New Tur are aliases created in the FontSubstitutes section of WIN.INI. These entries all point to the master font. When an alias font is specified, the font's character map contains a different character set from the master font and the other alias fonts.

IBM Courier 
IBM made Courier freely available in Postscript Type 1 format. Known as IBM Courier or simply Courier, it is available under the IBM/MIT X Consortium Courier Typefont agreement. Among other IBM-specific characters it contains optionally a dotted zero (which seems to have originated as an option on IBM 3270 display controllers) and a slashed zero.

Courier 10 Pitch BT and Courier Code 
 The Courier 10 Pitch BT typeface was released as a font by Bitstream. Courier 10 BT is heavier than Courier New and more closely approximates the look of the original Courier type on paper. The freely available version, often seen as a system font on electronic devices, includes the 255 characters of the ANSI character set in Type 1 format. Courier 10 BT has been donated to the X Consortium by Bitstream (along with Bitstream Charter) and is the default Courier font on most Linux distributions. Expanded Pan-European (W1G) character sets are made available for license by Bitstream.

Courier Code is a variant of Courier 10 Pitch BT for use in programming. The zero is dotted to better distinguish it from the capital O and the lowercase L has been altered to better distinguish it from the number one. The leading has been increased slightly as well.

Courier New 

Courier New appears as a system font on many electronic devices. This Courier variant was produced for electronic use by Monotype. Its thin appearance when printed on paper owes to its being "digitized directly from the golf ball of the IBM Selectric" without accounting for the visual weight normally added by the typewriter's ink ribbon. ClearType rendering technology includes a hack to make the font appear more legible on screens, though printouts retain the thin look. The font family includes Courier New, Courier New Bold, Courier New Italic, and Courier New Bold Italic.

Courier New was introduced as a system font with Windows 3.1, which also included raster Courier fonts. The fonts were also sold commercially by Ascender Corporation. The Ascender fonts have 'WGL' at the end of the font name, and cover only the WGL characters.

Courier New features higher line space than Courier. Punctuation marks were reworked to make the dots and commas heavier. Versions from 2.76 onward include Hebrew and Arabic glyphs, with most of the Arabic characters added on non-italic fonts. The styling of Arabic glyphs is similar to those found in Times New Roman but adjusted for monospace. The Courier New version 5.00 includes over 3100 glyphs, covering over 2700 characters per font.

Courier Prime 

This Courier typeface, developed by Alan Dague-Greene with funding from John August and Quote-Unquote Apps, includes a true Italic style. Courier Prime matches the metrics of Courier New and Courier Final Draft, with some design changes and improvements aimed at greater legibility and beauty. The typeface was released in January 2013 under the SIL Open Font License. In 2016 the family was extended with Sans Serif and Code versions. By mid-2018 the family included Semi-Bold and Medium versions (designed by M. Babek Aliassa) and a Cyrillic alphabet version (designed by Dmitry Novikov). All fonts in the family are downloadable for free and can be used in any application.

Courier Screenplay 
A typeface developed for Fade In Professional Screenwriting Software, Courier Screenplay is designed to offer the legibility of Courier 10 BT with the line counts favoured by screenwriters. The font is downloadable for free independent of the software and can be used in any application. The typeface provides the ANSI 255 character map used in Western European languages.

Courier Final Draft 
Courier Final Draft is a version of Courier 10 BT developed for the Final Draft screenwriting program. The installed font can be used in any application. Default settings in the program yield 55 lines per page.

Dark Courier 
Dark Courier is a normal-weight typeface rather than a semi-bold or bold as its name may imply. Dark Courier, developed as a TrueType font by HP, was one of the first fonts developed as a Courier New alternative for those who found that typeface too thin.

Courier Standard 

Courier Standard, Courier Standard Bold, Courier Standard Bold Italic, Courier Standard Italic are fonts distributed with Adobe Reader 6, as a replacement for the PostScript Courier fonts. The stroke terminators are flat instead of round. The typeface contains code pages 1252, Windows OEM Character Set. The font is Hinted and Smoothed for all point sizes. It contains OpenType layout tables aalt, dlig, frac, ordn, sups for Default Language in Latin script; dlig for TUR language in Latin script. Each font contains 374 glyphs.

Nimbus Mono L 
URW++ produced a version of Courier called Nimbus Mono L in 1984, and eventually released under the GPL and AFPL (as Type 1 font for Ghostscript) in 1996. It is one of the Ghostscript fonts, a free alternatives to 35 basic PostScript fonts (which include Courier). It is available in major free and open source operating systems.
Tex Gyre Cursor, developed by GUST ("the Polish TeX Users Group"), is based on the URW Nimbus Mono L typeface.
FreeMono, a free font descending from URW++ Nimbus Mono L, which in turn descends from Courier. It is one of free fonts developed in GNU FreeFont project, first published in 2002. It is used in some free software as Courier replacement or for Courier font substitution.

Alternatives and derivatives
Many monospaced typefaces used as alternatives to Courier in coding are sans-serif fonts for on-screen legibility.
Liberation Mono is a sans-serif font metrically equivalent to Courier New, developed by Ascender Corp. and published by Red Hat in 2007 under the GPL license with some exceptions. It is used in some Linux distributions as default font replacement for Courier New.
Cousine Croscore font, also by Ascender and basically the same as Liberation Mono 2.0

Applications

In Latin 1 text
Courier is commonly used in ASCII art because it is a monospaced font and is available almost universally. "Solid-style" ASCII art uses the darkness/lightness of each character to portray an object, which can be quantified in pixels (here in pt. 12):

In computer programming
Courier, as a common monospaced font, is often used to signify source code.

See also
 American Typewriter
 Core fonts for the Web
 Monospaced font
 Proportional font
 Sentence spacing

References

Bibliography
Macmillan, Neil. An A–Z of Type Designers. Yale University Press: 2006. .

External links
 Courier Prime
 Courier Prime Font

Monospaced typefaces
Slab serif typefaces
Typefaces and fonts introduced in the 1950s
Windows XP typefaces